Carbohydrate–protein interactions are the intermolecular and intramolecular interactions between protein and carbohydrate moieties. These interactions form the basis of specific recognition of carbohydrates by lectins. Carbohydrates are important biopolymers and have a variety of functions. Often carbohydrates serve a function as a recognition element. That is, they are specifically recognized by other biomolecules. Proteins which bind carbohydrate structures are known as lectins. Compared to the study of protein–protein and protein–DNA interaction, it is relatively recent that scientists get to know the protein–carbohydrate binding.

Many of these interactions involved carbohydrates found at the cell surface, as part of a membrane glycoprotein or glycolipid. These interactions can play a role in cellular adhesion and other cellular recognition events. Intramolecular carbohydrate–protein interactions refer to interactions between glycan and polypeptide moieties in glycoproteins or the glycosylated proteins.

Classification
Generally, there are two types of protein carbohydrate binding important in biological processes: Lectin and antibody.

Lectin

Lectin is a kind of protein that can bind to carbohydrate with their carbohydrate recognition domains (CRDs). We could use different CRD to classify them.

C-type
Ca2+ is required to activate the binding. Ca2+ binds to the protein and carbohydrate by non covalent bond. Mannose-binding protein (MBP) contains the C-type CRD.

P-type
Two types mannose-6-phosphate can recognize phosphorylated saccharide. One is cation-dependent and the other does not require cation to activate.

I-type
I-type lectin named from the immunoglobulin-like domain. Sialoadhesin is one of the I-type lectin, which binds specifically to sialic acid.

Antibody
Most antibodies have the similar structure except the hypervariable region which is called the antigen binding site. This region is constituted by the combination of various amino acids. When the antigen is a kind of carbohydrate (Polysaccharide), the binding could be regarded as a protein-carbohydrate interaction.

Biological function
Protein–carbohydrate interactions play an important role in biological function.
 Cell adhesion
 Signal Transduction
 Host-Pathogen Recognition
 Inflammation
 Stabilization of protein structure

Methods of study
X-ray crystallography
Just like other organic molecule study, X-ray crystallography is a very useful tool to know the detail information on the interaction between carbohydrate and protein.
NMR Study
By using titration, NOESY(Nuclear Overhauser Effect SpectroscopY), CIDNP experiments, the specificity and affinity of binding, association constants and equilibrium thermodynamic parameters of carbohydrate–protein binding can be studied.
Molecular Modeling
In many cases, the conformation information is required, however, sometimes it is not able to get directly from the experiments. So the knowledge-based model building approach is used.
Fluorescence Spectrometry
Fluorescence spectrometry is a useful tool and has its advantages: no procedure for separation and plenty of ways to get fluorophore source: there are some of amino acids and ligands that have fluorophore after they are activated.
Dual polarisation interferometry
Dual polarisation interferometry is a label free analytical technique for measuring interactions and associated conformational changes.

Advances in the study of protein–carbohydrate binding
Microarray-Based Study by Metal Nanoparticle Probes
Recently, studies by using metal nanoparticle probes to detect the carbohydrate–protein interactions were reported. Use of gold and silver nanoparticle probes in resonant light scattering (RLS) gives particular high sensitivity. Zhenxin Wang and coworker the same principle applied this method to detect the interaction between carbohydrate and protein.
Carbohydrate biosensor
As Lectin can strongly bind to specific carbohydrate, scientists develop several lectin-based carbohydrate biosensors.  Designed lectin contains specific groups can be detected by analytical method.
Isothermal Titration Calorimetry

References

Carbohydrate chemistry
Carbohydrates
Glycobiology